Home for the Holidays is the fifteenth album and fourth Christmas album by Christian group Point of Grace. It was released on October 5, 2010. It is their first full-length Christmas recording since their 2005 holiday release, Winter Wonderland. It is also their first full-length holiday release as a trio. The group once again worked with producer Nathan Chapman as well as his wife, Stephanie Chapman.

Track listing

Personnel 

Point of Grace
 Shelley Breen – vocals
 Denise Jones – vocals
 Leigh Cappillino – vocals

Musicians
 Mike Rojas – pianos, synthesizers 
 Jim Brickman – acoustic piano on "The Giver and the Gift"
 B. James Lowry – acoustic guitar 
 Bryan Sutton – acoustic guitar
 Ilya Toshinsky – acoustic guitar, banjo
 Jerry McPherson – electric guitars 
 Mike Johnson – steel guitar
 Andy Leftwich – fiddle, mandolin
 Jimmie Lee Sloas – bass
 Glenn Worf – bass
 John Gardner – drums
 Eric Darken – percussion
 Kirk "Jelly Roll" Johnson – harmonica
 Jonathan Yudkin – strings, string arrangements 

Children's Choir
 Caroline Breen
 Darby Mae Cappillino
 Price Jones
 Spence Jones

Production 
 Nathan Chapman – producer 
 Stephanie Chapman – producer, arrangements
 Jason Jenkins – A&R 
 Jamie Kiner – A&R
 Chuck Ainlay – engineer, mixing 
 Neal Cappellino – engineer
 Brian David Willis – engineer 
 Todd Tidwell – assistant engineer 
 Justin Francis – mix assistant 
 Stephen Jones – mix assistant
 Hank Williams – mastering at MasterMix (Nashville, Tennessee).
 Jason Campbell – production coordinator 
 Emily Mueller – production assistant
 Katherine Petillo – creative director
 Alexa Ward – design 
 Laura Dart – photography 
 Debbie Dover – hair stylist 
 Amber Lehman – stylist, wardrobe
 Edward St. George – make-up

Awards
The album won a Dove Award for Christmas Album of the Year at the 42nd GMA Dove Awards.

References

Point of Grace albums
Word Records albums
Christmas albums by American artists
2010 Christmas albums
Albums produced by Nathan Chapman (record producer)